The 2003–2004 Connecticut Huskies men's basketball team represented the University of Connecticut in the 2003–2004 NCAA Division I basketball season. Coached by Jim Calhoun, the Huskies played their home games at the Hartford Civic Center in Hartford, Connecticut, and on campus at the Harry A. Gampel Pavilion in Storrs, Connecticut, and were a member of the Big East Conference.  They won their record-tying sixth Big East tournament.  On April 6, 2004, they claimed their second national championship by defeating Georgia Tech, 82–73.

Roster

Schedule and results

|-
!colspan=9 style=|Exhibition games

|-
!colspan=9 style=| Regular Season

|-
!colspan=9 style=| Big East tournament

|-
!colspan=8 style=| NCAA tournament

Rankings

*AP did not release a Week 1 poll nor post-NCAA Tournament rankings

Awards and honors
 Emeka Okafor, NCAA Men's MOP Award

Team players drafted into the NBA

References

UConn Huskies men's basketball seasons
NCAA Division I men's basketball tournament championship seasons
NCAA Division I men's basketball tournament Final Four seasons
Connecticut Huskies
Connecticut
2003 in sports in Connecticut
2004 in sports in Connecticut